Junaid Zia (born 11 December 1983) is a Pakistani cricketer who has played List A cricket for the Pakistan national cricket team. He is a right-handed batsman and a right-arm medium-fast bowler.

The son of the Pakistan Cricket Board chairman Tauqir Zia, he was first integrated into the Pakistani squad at the World Cup Under-19 tournament in 2002. Zia was initially brought to the public's attention for all the wrong reasons, as his bowling action was considered by Asoka de Silva to be somewhat suspect. Having honed his bowling skill he made his first international match in 2003–04 against Bangladesh.

He has received praise for his levels of fitness by Aamer Sohail, the Pakistani selector. Zia joined the HBL camp held in November 1998. Junaid further said, "that was the era of fast bowlers. Unfortunately none of the players from the camp could make it to the international level. I still remember there was a young talented fast bowler from Garrison Academy named Shahrukh who was yard faster than me".

References

1983 births
Living people
Pakistan One Day International cricketers
Pakistani cricketers
Rawalpindi cricketers
Pakistan Customs cricketers
Lahore Whites cricketers
Habib Bank Limited cricketers
Zarai Taraqiati Bank Limited cricketers
Lahore Eagles cricketers
Punjab (Pakistan) cricketers
Cricketers from Lahore